"" is the national anthem of the Sahrawi Arab Democratic Republic (SADR) of Western Sahara. In 1979, the song became the SADR's national anthem.

Lyrics

Notes

References

National anthems
Year of song missing
African anthems
Songwriter unknown
Song articles with missing songwriters
National anthem compositions in F major
Society of the Sahrawi Arab Democratic Republic